Elizabeth Leishman Forsyth (6 April 1945 – May 2021) was a Scottish international female lawn and indoor bowler.

Bowls career
Forsyth represented Scotland in the fours at the 1994 Commonwealth Games in Victoria, British Columbia, Canada and won a bronze medal, the 1998 Commonwealth Games, 2002 Commonwealth Games and 2006 Commonwealth Games.

She also won a fours silver medal at the 2000 World Outdoor Bowls Championship in Johannesburg, South Africa.

In 1995 she won the fours gold medal at the Atlantic Bowls Championships and ten years later won the fours silver medal at the Championships.

References

External links
 

1945 births
2021 deaths
Scottish female bowls players
Commonwealth Games medallists in lawn bowls
Commonwealth Games bronze medallists for Scotland
Bowls players at the 1994 Commonwealth Games
Bowls players at the 1998 Commonwealth Games
Bowls players at the 2002 Commonwealth Games
Bowls players at the 2006 Commonwealth Games
Bowls European Champions
Medallists at the 1994 Commonwealth Games